The 1969 Hawaii Rainbows football team represented the University of Hawaiʻi at Mānoa as an independent during the 1969 NCAA College Division football season. In their second season under head coach Dave Holmes, the Rainbows compiled a 6–3–1 record.

Schedule

References

Hawaii
Hawaii Rainbow Warriors football seasons
Hawaii Rainbows football